The Midland Great Western Railway (MGWR) was the third largest Irish gauge railway company in Ireland. It was incorporated in 1845 and absorbed into the Great Southern Railways in 1924.

The MGWR served part of Leinster, County Cavan in Ulster and much of Connacht. Its network was entirely within what in 1922 became the Irish Free State.

Early development
Construction of the main line began from Dublin in January 1846 and proceeded westwards in stages, supervised by chief engineer G. W. Hemans.

Dublin to Galway
The MGWR was first, going via  and reaching Galway,  from Dublin, in August 1851. It was not until 1859 that the GS&WR got as far as Athlone. The GS&WR was obliged to operate its service over MGWR track between Athlone and Galway, paying the MGWR 65% of passenger and 55% of goods receipts. The GS&WR retained a separate station, which is now the sole operating station, as the last service to the MGWR station ran on 13 January 1985.. The branch is to be made into a rail trail as part of the Dublin-Galway Greenway by 2020.

Galway to Clifden
In 1890 the Government granted the MGWR £264,000 to build a railway to Clifden on the Atlantic coast of County Galway. It opened as far as Oughterard in January 1895 and to Clifden in July 1895. Due to its inland route it did not serve the bulk of the area's population, so the GSR closed it in 1935.

A similar branch line was built at the same time from Westport to Achill on the Atlantic coast of County Mayo. The MGW built the first section, opening it as far as Newport in February 1894 and Mulranny in May 1894. The Board of Works built the section from Mulranny to Achill, which opened in May 1895. The GSR closed the line in 1937.

Branch lines

At its peak the MGWR had a number of branch lines:
 Clonsilla to Navan (opened as the Dublin and Meath Railway 1862, leased to the MGWR 1869, sold to the MGWR 1888)
 Kilmessan Junction to Athboy (opened 1864, closed 1963)
 Nesbitt Junction (near Enfield) to Edenderry (opened 1877, closed 1963)
 Streamstown to Clara, County Offaly (opened 1863, closed 1963)
 Attymon Junction to Loughrea (light railway worked by the MGWR, opened 1890, closed 1975)
 Galway to Clifden (opened 1895, closed 1935)
 Westport to Achill (opened 1895, closed 1937)
 Inny Junction to Cavan Town (opened 1856, closed 1960)
 Kilfree Junction to Ballaghaderreen (opened by the Sligo and Ballaghaderreen Railway 1874, sold to the MGWR 1877, closed 1963)
 Crossdoney to Killeshandra (opened 1886, closed 1960)
 Athlone to Westport (opened by the Great Northern and Western Railway 1860–66, leased to the MGWR 1870, sold to the MGWR 1890)
  to Ballinrobe (light railway worked by the MGWR, opened 1892, closed 1960)
 Manulla to Ballina, County Mayo (opened 1873)
 extension from Ballina to Killala (opened 1893, closed 1937)

Consolidation
In 1924 the Oireachtas of the Irish Free State passed the Railways Act, which that November merged the MGWR with the Great Southern and Western Railway (GS&WR), Cork, Bandon and South Coast Railway to form the Great Southern Railway. In January 1925, that was joined by the Dublin and South Eastern Railway to form the Great Southern Railways.

Locomotives and rolling stock

Locomotives and rolling stock were maintained at MGWR's Broadstone works in Dublin.

Livery
The MGWR painted all of its locomotives bright emerald until about 1902, when the first of the new Class A 4-4-0 express locomotives were outshopped in royal blue. This did not wear well and in 1905 the company adopted grass green. From about 1913 locos were painted gloss black until the MGWR became part of the GSR in 1925. From then on, all locomotives were gradually repainted plain unlined dark grey.

Passenger coaches were finished in varnish or brown paint until the blue livery was introduced in 1901. As on the locomotives this weathered badly and from 1905 the MGWR reverted to brown, which after 1910 was not so well-adorned with lining. From October 1918 coaches were painted a very dark Crimson and after 1924 the GSR used a similar shade for some years.

Preservation

No MGWR locomotive has been preserved but several of its six-wheeled carriages exist.
 No. 25 - Downpatrick and County Down Railway. Originally a full 2nd, this coach is on display in the carriage gallery awaiting restoration.
 No. 47 - Ulster Folk and Transport Museum. Built in 1844 and notable for being used as William Dargan's private saloon. Fully restored.
 No. 47M - This carriage used to be based at the DCDR, but unfortunately had to be scrapped.
 No. 53 - Downpatrick and County Down Railway. Originally a full 2nd, this coach is on display in the carriage gallery awaiting restoration.
 No. 62M - Railway Preservation Society of Ireland. A full 3rd, this carriage is meant to be under restoration for use at the DCDR.
 No. 84 - Clifden. Intended to be restored as part of the Station House Hotel's collection.

Present day
Those of the former MGWR's main lines that are still open are owned and operated by Iarnród Éireann. Routes between Dublin and Sligo, Athlone and Galway, Athlone and Westport and the Ballina branch remain open to passenger traffic. The Meath on Track campaign is campaigning to have the Navan — Clonsilla line (not to be confused with the former GNR Navan — Drogheda line) reopened earlier than the 2030 date announced under current Iarnród Éireann policy. The Edenderry, Clifden, Achill, Cavan, Killeshandra, Ballaghaderreen branch line, Ballinrobe, Killala and Loughrea branches lines are all closed.

This proposal will not go ahead as the railway is due to be replaced with the Dublin-Galway greenway starting from 2020.

Three former MGWR stations are now hotels, two of which are called the "Station House Hotel" but are unconnected by ownership. They are the expanded former Clifden station in County Galway, Kilmessan Junction in County Meath and the Mullranny Park Hotel at Mulranny, County Mayo.

The Great Western Greenway is a greenway rail trail that uses the route of the former Westport — Achill branch line.

Senior people
Chairmen
 Lord Dunsandle (1845-1847)
 John Ennis (1847-1865)
 William Maunsell (1865-1865 - 2 days)
 Sir Ralph Smith Cusack (1865-1905)
 Honourable Richard Nugent, youngest son of the ninth Earl of Westmeath (1905-1912)
 Major H. C. Cusack (1912-)
Deputy Chairmen 
This position was not always filled.
 John Ennis (1845-1847)
 Honourable Richard Nugent (Briefly in 1903)
 Major H. C. Cusack (1905-1912)
General Managers
 Joseph Tatlow (1890-1912)
Chief Mechanical Engineer/Locomotive Superintendent
 John Dewrance (1847-) >
 Edward Wilson (1854-)
 Joseph Cabry (1856-1862)
 Rober Ramage (1862-)
 Martin Atock (1865-1900)
 Edward Cusack (1901-1915)
 W. H. Morton (1916-1924)

See also
History of rail transport in Ireland
Rail transport in Ireland
Iarnród Éireann

Notes

Sources

Further reading

External links

MGWR at Irishrailwayana.com
MGWR Architecture at Archiseek.com
Galway-Clifden and Westport-Achill at the Institution of Engineers of Ireland
History of the Westport-Achill MGWR Railway

 
Irish gauge railways
Railway companies disestablished in 1925
Defunct railway companies of Ireland